The Windtech Tonic is a Spanish single-place paraglider that was designed and produced by Windtech Parapentes of Gijón. It is now out of production.

Design and development
The Tonic was designed as a beginner to intermediate glider for new pilots. The models are each named for their approximate wing area in square metres.

The glider was designed to be easy and smooth to inflate and launch and to fly with a high degree of stability and resistance to collapses.

The glider wing is made from Porcher Marine Skytex 44 g/m2 nylon fabric. The rib reinforcements are 180 g/m2 Dacron, with the trailing edge reinforcement fabricated of 175 g/m2 polyester. The lines are all sheathed Kevlar of 1.1 and 1.7 mm diameter. The risers are made from 20 mm wide Polyamida strapping.

Variants
Tonic 25
Extra small-sized model for lighter pilots. The glider model is AFNOR Standard certified.
Tonic 27
Small-sized model for lighter pilots. The glider model is Deutscher Hängegleiterverband e.V. (DHV) 1 certified.
Tonic 29
Mid-sized model for medium-weight pilots. The glider model is DHV 1 certified.
Tonic 32
Large-sized model for heavier pilots. The glider model is DHV 1 certified.

Specifications (Tonic 27)

References

External links

Tonic
Paragliders